Vibert Edmund Cornwall (born October 1938) is a Vincentian jazz singer known professionally as Ray King. He is the brother of Reginald Cornwall MBE. He is known for being a formative influence on the 2-Tone movement, originated in Coventry, England during the late  late 1970s and early 1980s. Vibert is a passionate supporter of Coventry's West Indian and black ethnic communities and received an honorary doctorate of letters form Coventry University on 23 November 2010 in recognition for his volunteering and altruistic efforts.

Vibert migrated to Coventry, England as a teenager from Saint Vincent and the Grenadines. He began singing in clubs across Coventry in 1966. It was around this time that Vibert adopted the stage name 'Ray King' after joining the band 'Suzi and the Kingsize Kings', at which point the band renamed to 'The Ray King Soul Band'.

References 

Living people
1938 births
People from Saint Vincent (Antilles)
Musicians from Coventry